Mottistone is a village on the Isle of Wight, located in the popular tourist area the Back of the Wight. It is located 8 Miles southwest of Newport in the southwest of the island, and is home to the National Trust's Mottistone Manor.

History
The Island's only megalithic monument, the Longstone is situated nearby. The name Mottistone (the Speaker's or pleader's stone) almost certainly derives from the Longstone, which was used as a meeting place (or "moot-stone") in Anglo-Saxon times.

Geography
Mottistone Down is a Site of Special Scientific Interest north of Mottistone, and covering ; it adjoins the Brighstone Down, the central part of the ridge. Most of the area is owned by the National Trust, including the manor, down and cottages, and is biologically important due to its chalk and neutral grasslands.

Today
Public transport is provided by Southern Vectis buses on route 12.

The church of St Peter and St Paul's hosts part of an annual Christmas Tree festival (the Brighstone Christmas Tree Festival) that has become very popular.

References
Natural England citation sheet for Mottistone Down
Mottistone, Geograph British Isles website

External links

Villages on the Isle of Wight
Mottistone Down
National Trust properties on the Isle of Wight
Former civil parishes in the Isle of Wight
Brighstone